Inimey Nangathan is a 2007 Indian Tamil-language animated children's film, directed by Venkybaboo. It was the first Tamil film to be animated. The film went unnoticed due to the lack of big stars. The film won the National Film Award for Best Animated Film.

Plot 
The film depicts Vichu, Varadhu, Vaithi, and Govind as four friends who earn their livelihood doing Kathakalakshepam. They want to become rich and famous. They come across an old lady, who advises them to meet a Swamiji; she tells them she will help them become rich overnight. The Swamiji agrees to help them, but on one condition, they should retrieve a holy necklace from Rakshasas.

The four friends set out to the cave, where they meet a colorful character from the sea in a golden palace. They reach a flowing desert, where Govind pushes them into a pit and then a very tall mountain rises, closing Govind's story.

The others reach a hill with stones. Varadhu wants to kill them, so he pushes a big stone onto them. Varadhu eats a fruit given to him by the Swamiji. Since he ate the full fruit, he becomes very fat and his face gets stuck in a doorway. This is the end of Varadhu.

Vaithi does not listen to Vichu and says that all the diamonds belong to him. He pushes Vichu into a valley. The diamonds become weapons, touching Vaithi, and his body disappears. If he goes out of the cave, he blends into the air. This is the end of Vaithi.

Vichu falls into the valley. He finds the holy necklace, but a rakshas guards it. Vichu fights with the rakshas and takes the necklace.

Later Vichu gives the necklace to the Swamiji. In exchange for the holy necklace, the Swamiji gives the golden palace to Vichu, but Vichu refuses. He tells her that he has gotten what he wanted in his journey and goes back to his village. The Swamiji tells him telepathically that he will come back, so she will wait for him. The film ends with a golden cow following Vichu.

Cast 
 M.S. Bhaskar as Vishwanathan a.k.a. Vichu
 Pandu as Varadarajan a.k.a. Varadhu
 Vasu Vikram as Vaidyanathan a.k.a. Vaithi
 Maaran as Venkata Govindarajan a.k.a. Govind
Murali Kumar as Priest

Music 
Songs were composed by Ilaiyaraaja

See also 

 Indian animation industry
 List of Indian animated feature films

References

External links 

2007 films
2007 animated films
2000s Tamil-language films
Films scored by Ilaiyaraaja
Indian animated films
Indian children's films
Best Animated Feature Film National Film Award winners
2007 directorial debut films
Indian animated fantasy films